Tea for Two was a short-lived Australian television series, which aired on Melbourne television station HSV-7 on Tuesdays from 1 March to 2 August 1960. The series was a music programme with Jocelyn Terry and singer Guido Lorraine. Each episode was aired in a 15-minute daytime time-slot.

Following the end of this series, Jocelyn Terry (who had previously worked at ABV-2) began work on another HSV-7 series on Tuesdays called On Your Behalf, an informational series with Brian Naylor. It is not known if any kinescopes or video-tapes remain of either series today, given the wiping of the era.

References

Seven Network original programming
1960 Australian television series debuts
1960 Australian television series endings
Australian music television series
English-language television shows
Black-and-white Australian television shows